Carl Lee III (born February 6, 1961) is a former American football cornerback in the National Football League (NFL). He was drafted by the Minnesota Vikings in the seventh round of the 1983 NFL Draft, and played with the Vikings for all but his final season with the New Orleans Saints. From 1995 to 2005, Lee was the head football coach at West Virginia State University and compiled an overall record of 34 wins and 75 losses (34–75) during his time with the Yellow Jackets.

He played college football at Marshall. In 1995, he was inducted into the Marshall University Athletics Hall of Fame for his collegiate career in football and track and field.

Professional career

Minnesota Vikings
Lee was drafted by the Minnesota Vikings in the seventh round of the 1983 NFL Draft. He played 11 years for the team from 1983 to 1993. During that time he started 144 of 169 games and had 779 tackles, 31 interceptions, returning two for touchdowns. He made the Pro Bowl in 1988, 1989, 1990.

New Orleans Saints
In 1994, Lee joined the New Orleans Saints. In his only year with the team he started eight of 12 games, recording 28 tackles and two interceptions.

After the 1994 season, Lee retired after 12 years in the NFL. He finished his career starting 152 of 181 games, recording 799 tackles, 31 interceptions, two touchdowns, and seven fumble recoveries.

Coaching career
Following his retirement from the NFL, in January 1996, Lee accepted the head coaching position at West Virginia State University. After the 2005 season, he resigned his position as head coach, and during his ten seasons with the Yellow Jackets, Lee compiled an overall record of 34 wins and 75 losses (34–75).

On February 17, 2022, it was announced that Lee would become the head football coach for South Charleston High School, his alma mater. February 3,2023 It was announced the Lee resigned as Head Football Coach of South Charleston High School.

Head coaching record

References

1961 births
Living people
American football cornerbacks
Marshall Thundering Herd football players
Marshall Thundering Herd men's track and field athletes
Minnesota Vikings players
New Orleans Saints players
West Virginia State Yellow Jackets football coaches
National Conference Pro Bowl players
South Charleston High School alumni
People from South Charleston, West Virginia
Players of American football from West Virginia
Track and field athletes from West Virginia
African-American coaches of American football
African-American players of American football
African-American male track and field athletes
21st-century African-American people
20th-century African-American sportspeople